Louis Charles may refer to:
 Louis Charles, Duke of Schleswig-Holstein-Sonderburg-Franzhagen (1684–1707)
 Louis Charles, Count of Eu (1700–1775)
 Louis Charles, Count of Beaujolais (1779–1808)